The Schafarnisch is a mountain of the Bernese Alps, located on the border between the Swiss cantons of Fribourg and Bern. It lies north of Boltigen, in the group culminating at the Schafberg.

References

External links
 Schafarnisch on Hikr

Mountains of the Alps
Mountains of Switzerland
Mountains of the canton of Fribourg
Mountains of the canton of Bern
Bern–Fribourg border
Two-thousanders of Switzerland